Martin Walker may refer to:

 Martin Walker (actor) (1901–1955), British film actor
 Martin Walker (football director), former director of Hull City football club
 Martin Walker (reporter), British reporter and mystery writer
 Captain Martin Walker, main character of Spec Ops: The Line

See also
Martin Walkyier (born 1967), English singer